Richard Kelly (born 10 September 1987) is a retired Welsh rugby union player. He last played Lock with the Scarlets in the Pro14.
Today Richard works as a transition coach for the Ospreys.

Rugby career
Kelly was born in Swansea, and played for both Mumbles and Dunvant before signing for Swansea RFC in 2007. He made his debut for the Ospreys regional side in May 2009 playing the last 6 minutes of the Celtic League match against Munster, this would be his only league appearance for the Ospreys.
 Over the next three season Kelly continued to play for Swansea making a further 5 appearances for the Ospreys, all in the Anglo-Welsh Cup, before joining the Scarlets in the summer of 2012.

Kelly got a broken arm in a Champions Cup game against Leicester Tigers in October 2014. Unfortunately, he failed to recover properly from this injury, and he announced his retirement in September 2014. He has also spent time working as a forwards coach at Carmarthen Quins and have also been part of the academy coaching staff at the Scarlets for a couple of years.

References

1987 births
Rugby union players from Swansea
Living people
Scarlets players
Rugby union articles needing photographs
Swansea RFC players
Ospreys (rugby union) players